Roy C. Booth (born August 26, 1965) is a United States speculative fiction, fantasy and horror author. He has written many novels and short stories, many of them co-written with others including Theater of the Macabre, The Flesh of Fallen Angels: A Horror Western Novella (part of the Gibson Blount series co-written with R. Thomas Riley) and Sherlock Holmes And the Case of the Man-Made Vacuum (co-written with Nicholas Johnson). Booth has a credit on IMDb for The Day Lufberry Won It All. and a credit with Doollee, the Playwrights database.

Booth is also a poet, journalist, essayist, and screenwriter. He is married to published playwright Cynthia Booth, and is owner/manager of Roy’s Comics & Games of Bemidji, Minnesota.

The author appeared Diversicon21

Biography 

Born in 1965 in Bemidji, Minnesota, Booth became involved in regional theater with his wife, Cynthia Booth. From the age of six, Booth became aware that he wanted to be a writer. He had difficulty reading until he realised that he read in blocks, not line-by-line as most people do, after picking up a comic.
A 1983 graduate of Pillager High School and a 2011 Hall of Fame inductee, Booth has college degrees from Central Lakes College (MN in Associate Arts) and Bemidji State University (BA in English/Speech-Theater and an MA in English with a Creative Writing Emphasis). On June 21, 2014, Central Lakes College honored 75 outstanding alumni at its special recognition event for its 75th anniversary including Booth. Central Lakes College stated, "This honorary award was established to recognize alumni who are noteworthy for their significant professional  achievements and/or exemplary leadership in community activities."
He has an extensive theater background having worked on over 200 professional and amateur productions as an actor, director, stage manager, scenic designer, make-up/FX designer, and fight choreographer.

In March 2012, Booth was interviewed by Lakeland Public Television on his views on comics and his novels.
Booth considers writing to be a craft, albeit sometimes an invisible one. He has often revised theater and motion picture scripts written by others.

Bibliography 
 Altered States: a cyberpunk sci-fi anthology 
 A Forest of Dreams (Indie Authors Press) 
 Terminal: The Play with Brian Keene, Bloodletting Press

References

External links 
 

1965 births
Living people
American science fiction writers
American fantasy writers
American horror writers
20th-century American novelists
20th-century American male writers
21st-century American novelists
American male novelists
American male short story writers
20th-century American short story writers
21st-century American short story writers
21st-century American male writers